The 2010–11 Football League Two season, (known as the  Npower League Two for sponsorship reasons), was the lowest division of the Football League for that season. It began on 7 August 2010 and concluded on 28 May 2011 with the play-off final.

Changes from last season

Team changes

From League Two
Promoted to League One
 Notts County
 Rochdale
 Bournemouth
 Dagenham and Redbridge

Relegated to Conference National
 Grimsby Town
 Darlington

To League Two
Relegated from Football League One
 Wycombe Wanderers
 Southend United
 Stockport County
 Gillingham
Promoted from Conference National
 Stevenage
 Oxford United

Team overview

Stadia and locations

Personnel and sponsoring

Managerial changes

League table
A total of 24 teams contest the division: 18 sides remaining in the division from last season, four relegated from the League One, and two promoted from Conference National.

Play-offs

Semifinals

Torquay United won 2 – 0 on aggregate.

Stevenage won 3 – 0 on aggregate.

Final

Results

Season statistics

Top scorers

Top assists

Scoring
First goal of the season: Peter Vincenti for Stevenage against Macclesfield Town, 6:43 minutes (7 August 2010)
Highest scoring game: 11 goals – Accrington Stanley 7–4 Gillingham (2 October 2010)
Most goals scored in a game by one team: 8 goals
 Crewe Alexandra 8–1 Cheltenham Town (2 April 2011)
Widest winning margin: 7 goals  
Crewe Alexandra 7–0 Barnet (21 August 2010)
Crewe Alexandra 8–1 Cheltenham Town (2 April 2011)
Fewest games failed to score in: 7 – Crewe Alexandra
Most games failed to score in: 17
 Hereford United
 Stevenage
 Stockport County

Discipline
Most yellow cards (club): 78 – Hereford United
Most yellow cards (player): 13 – John McGrath (Burton Albion)
Most red cards (club): 9 – Stevenage
Most red cards (player): 2
 Luke Foster (Stevenage)
 Abdul Osman (Northampton Town)
 Steven Schumacher (Bury)
 Michael Townsend (Hereford United)
 Jamie Vincent (Aldershot Town)
Most fouls (club): 563 – Gillingham
Most fouls (player): 94 – Matt Harold (Shrewsbury Town)

Clean sheets
Most clean sheets: 17 – Wycombe Wanderers
Fewest clean sheets: 6 – Stockport County

Monthly awards

References

 
EFL League Two seasons
3
4
Eng